Roraback is a surname. It is a shortened version of "Rorabacher", a name assumed by a German-speaking family who migrated to New York around 1700 from one of several settlements named "Rohrbach" in Lorraine. Notable people with the surname include:

Alberto T. Roraback (1849-1923), judge of the Connecticut Supreme Court; brother of political boss J. Henry Roraback
Andrew Roraback (born 1960), American politician
Catherine Roraback (1920-2007), civil rights attorney in Connecticut, granddaughter of judge Alberto T. Roraback
J. Henry Roraback (1870-1937), American Republican political boss and businessman in Connecticut; brother of judge Alberto T. Roraback

References